Starpeace is a 1985 concept album by Yoko Ono, designed to spread a message of peace around the world as an opposition to Ronald Reagan's "Star Wars" missile defense system. As with most Ono albums, it did not chart extensively but the single release of "Hell in Paradise" reached #16 on the US dance charts. The album was subtitled An Earth Play for Sun and Air in the booklet and on the disc.

Aftermath
In 1986, Ono set out on a world tour to accompany the album's message. The CD reissue by Rykodisc in 1997, includes a live recording of "Imagine" from the sellout Budapest show of the tour. An a cappella version of "Now or Never" from the same show was also a bonus track on A Story. Like with the Rykodisc reissue of It's Alright, the 1997 release of Starpeace used newly remixed versions of all songs. The original mixes only received a CD release in Japan in 1985.

The 1984 video documentary release Yoko Ono: Now & Then includes footage of the recording sessions for Starpeace. Over the end credits, Ono performs an unreleased song apparently entitled "Rainbow Time".

"Cape Clear" was released as the album's second single, available on the 12" format. The single features a Vocal Remix and Instrumental Mix of "Cape Clear" along with a re-edit of "Walking on Thin Ice" on the flipside.

Reception

The album received mixed reviews. Sounds gave it a one star (out of five) review, calling it "a slab of pretentious AOR offal". Spin writer Armond White called it "a Sesame Street album for children who think My Weekly Reader has been withholding the truth", and said that "the album's placidity and earnestness make embarrassing claims on our emotions". Allmusic writer Richie Unterberger retrospectively gave it two stars, stating that the tracks were "often imbued with a kind of sappy utopianism". Peter Buckley, in The Rough Guide to Rock, has described the album as "a rather bombastic error of judgement, laden down by pseudo-cosmic philosophizing". Rick Shefchik, in the Charlotte Observer called it "the same old '60s hippie drivel".

On the other hand, Robert Palmer of The New York Times gave the album a positive review, calling it "splended", viewing it as "the most balanced album Miss Ono has made", and describing it as "state-of-the-art pop music for 1985". Rolling Stone also reviewed the album positively, with Anthony Decurtis writing that "Starpeace seamlessly fuses artistic daring and accessibility... there can be no denying that this fifty-two-year-old pop star now fully deserves to be reckoned with on her own demanding terms".

The poor response to the album and low ticket sales on the world tour led to Ono withdrawing from making music, later saying "After Starpeace I was totally discouraged...by the fact that there was no kind of demand for what I was doing, to put it mildly!". She returned to music with the critically acclaimed Rising in 1996.

Track listing
All songs written by Yoko Ono, except where noted.

Singles

Personnel
Yoko Ono – vocals, cover concept
Bernie Worrell, Jeff Bova – keyboards
Eddie Martinez – guitar, guitar synthesizer, electric sitar
L. Shankar – violin
Robbie Shakespeare – bass guitar
Sly Dunbar – drums, electronic drums, percussion
Tony Williams – drums
Aïyb Dieng, Daniel Ponce, Anton Fier – percussion
Tony Levin – whistle
Bernard Fowler, Yolanda Lee Lewis – backing vocals
Nona Hendryx – backing vocals on "Hell in Paradise" and "Starpeace"
Sean Lennon – vocals on "Starpeace"

Technical
Produced by Bill Laswell and Yoko Ono
Recorded and mixed by Rob Stevens
Francesco Scavullo – cover photography

"Imagine" (Rykodisc CD Reissue Bonus Track)
Recorded live during the Starpeace tour in Budapest, Hungary on March 14, 1986.
Yoko Ono – vocal
Jimmy Rip – guitar
Leigh Foxx – bass guitar
Mark Rivera, Phil Ashley – keyboards
Benny Gramm – drums
Steve Scales – percussion

Tour

In 1986 Yoko set out on a goodwill world tour for Starpeace, mostly visiting Eastern European countries that she felt were in need of her message of peace. Ono refused to tour with a corporate sponsor and personally financed the endeavour herself. The media were largely unfair in their coverage of the tour, accusing Ono of "ego-tripping" and ridiculing her for underselling venues. In one case, a photo of Ono rehearsing to an empty hall before the show was printed as if nobody had come to the actual concert. A German DJ was also encouraging people to turn up and throw glass bottles at her.

However, the fans loved the shows, critics widely praised her for her performances, and she filled a venue of 15,000 in Budapest. That said, planned US tour dates were postponed and eventually cancelled due to disappointing ticket sales. Rykodisc's 1997 CD reissues of Ono's albums made available live versions of "Imagine" and "Now or Never" from the tour. The Starpeace setlist usually consisted of:

"Midsummer New York"
"Give Me Something"
"Kiss Kiss Kiss"
"It Happened"
"Walking on Thin Ice"
"Death of Samantha"
"Goodbye Sadness"
"Never Say Goodbye"
"Hell in Paradise"
"Sky People"
"Starpeace"
"I Love All of Me"
"I See Rainbows"
"Dream Love"
"Now or Never"
"Imagine" (encore)
"Give Peace a Chance" (encore)

Release history

References

External links
 Instant Karma! – Starpeace Tour 1986 special

Yoko Ono albums
1986 albums
Albums produced by Bill Laswell
Albums produced by Yoko Ono
Rykodisc albums